The 1996 XL Bermuda Open was a men's tennis tournament played on outdoor clay courts in Paget in Bermuda and was part of the World Series of the 1996 ATP Tour. It was the fourth edition of the tournament and ran from April 15 through April 21, 1996.

Champions

Men's singles

 MaliVai Washington defeated  Marcelo Filippini 6–7(6–8), 6–4, 7–5
 It was Washington's only title of the year and the 4th of his career.

Men's doubles

 Jan Apell /  Brent Haygarth defeated  Pat Cash /  Patrick Rafter 3–6, 6–1, 6–3
 It was Apell's only title of the year and the 9th of his career. It was Haygarth's 1st title of the year and the 3rd of his career.

XL Bermuda Open
XL Bermuda Open